The New Zealand women' cricket team  toured the  West Indian Island of St Kitts and St Vincent from 10 to 27 September 2014. The tour consisted of four One Day International matches of ICC Women's Championship and three Twenty20 International matches. The first three ODI matches were part of the 2014–16 ICC Women's Championship.

Squads

ODI Series

1st ODI

2nd ODI

3rd ODI

4th ODI

T20I series

1st T20I

2nd T20I

3rd T20I

References

External links 

 Series Home
 ICC Women's Championship Home

2014–16 ICC Women's Championship
New Zealand 2014
West Indies 2014
2014 in New Zealand cricket
2014 in West Indian cricket
2014
International cricket competitions in 2014
cricket
2014 in women's cricket